Acremodontina is a genus of sea snails, marine gastropod mollusks in the family Ataphridae, the false top snails.

Species
Species within the genus Acremodontina include:
 Acremodontina alazon (Hedley, 1905)
 Acremodontina atypica (Powell, 1937)
 Acremodontina boucheti Marshall, 1995
 Acremodontina carinata (Powell, 1940)
 Acremodontina kermadecensis Marshall, 1995
 Acremodontina magna Marshall, 1995
 Acremodontina poutama (E. C. Smith, 1962)
 Acremodontina simplex (Powell, 1937)
 Acremodontina translucida (May, 1915)
 Acremodontina varicosa Marshall, 1995

References

External links
 To World Register of Marine Species
 B.A. Marshall, 1995: Recent and tertiary Trochaclididae from the southwest Pacific (Mollusca: Gastropoda: Trochoidea); The Veliger  v. 38 (1995)

 
Ataphridae